Ann-Charlotte Gun Lilja (also Ann-Charlott; born 10 June 1946) is a Swedish swimmer who won a silver medal in the 4 × 100 m freestyle relay at the 1966 European Aquatics Championships. Two years earlier at the 1964 Summer Olympics she finished fifth in the same event and eighth in the 400 m freestyle.

As of 2010, she was still competing in swimming in the masters category.

References

1946 births
Swimmers at the 1964 Summer Olympics
Swedish female freestyle swimmers
Olympic swimmers of Sweden
Living people
European Aquatics Championships medalists in swimming
SK Najaden swimmers
Swimmers from Gothenburg
20th-century Swedish women
21st-century Swedish women